Queen Mary's Peak is the summit of the island of Tristan da Cunha, in the South Atlantic Ocean. It has an elevation of 2,062 metres (6,765 ft) above sea level. It is named after Mary of Teck, the Queen consort of King George V. It is the highest point of the British overseas territory of Saint Helena, Ascension and Tristan da Cunha, and of any British overseas territory with a permanent population.

Outline
The mountain is the peak of the massive shield volcano which forms the island. This lake is normally frozen during the winter, and the upper slopes of the volcano are covered in snow.

The only recorded eruption began on 10 October 1961 from a vent on the north shore of the island, and continued into March 1962. The entire population of the island (264) had to be evacuated and did not return until 1963. There was an eruption before it during the early 18th century on the main peak on Tristan da Cunha when the island was not inhabited, as islanders were unaware about previous volcanic activity before the 1961 eruption as they could not find any evidence of previous eruptions. There was also a 2004 eruption which happened underwater as there was an earthquake on Tristan da Cunha as well pumice that was picked up by fishermen suggesting that the volcano is still active.

Queen Mary's Peak was used by sailors on the route from Europe to the Indian Ocean and beyond as a navigational aid. In the 17th century the East India Company instructed captains to sail via Tristan. In 2004, Ellen MacArthur sighted the Peak on her record-breaking circumnavigation of the world.

Climbing the peak

The first known attempt to climb the peak was in 1793 by the French naturalist Louis-Marie Aubert du Petit-Thouars, but this was without success. However, from this expedition hundreds of plants were collected and catalogued. In January 1817, the first successful climb was made to the peak. Queen Mary's Peak is a steep climb and can take 5 to 10 hours, depending on the capability of the walker. The walk and climb is allowed only when accompanied by a local guide.

Queen Mary's Peak is the brand name for Tristan da Cunha island knitwear, which is exported to New Zealand.

See also

 Geography of Tristan da Cunha
 List of mountains and hills of Saint Helena, Ascension and Tristan da Cunha
 List of volcanoes in Tristan da Cunha

References

 Tristan da Cunha Island Tour: Peak

Other projects

Volcanoes of Tristan da Cunha
Volcanic crater lakes
Geography of Tristan da Cunha
Mountains and hills of British Overseas Territories